Ralph A. Alvarado (born April 30, 1970) is an American physician and politician and is currently serving as the 15th Commissioner of the Tennessee Department of Health. He served as a member of the Kentucky Senate representing the 28th District from 2015 to 2023. Upon taking office, he became the first Hispanic person elected to the Kentucky General Assembly. His father is from Costa Rica and his mother is from Argentina. He assumed office on January 1, 2015, serving until January 6, 2023, when he would resign to accept the role of commissioner.

Alvarado was born in San Francisco, California and raised in Pacifica and San Jose, California. He graduated from Bellarmine College Preparatory in San Jose in 1988. He graduated from Loma Linda University in California in 1990 with a Bachelor of Science degree in biology and completed an MD from the same university in 1994. He completed his residency at the University of Kentucky Chandler Medical Center.

He spoke at the 2016 Republican National Convention.

He sponsored a 2017 medical malpractice bill that was later struck down by the Kentucky Supreme Court for obstructing access to the courts.

Alvarado was chosen by Governor Matt Bevin to be his running mate in the 2019 Kentucky gubernatorial election. The Bevin-Alvarado ticket lost the general election on November 5, 2019, to the Democratic ticket of Andy Beshear and Jacqueline Coleman.

On November 22, 2022, Tennessee Governor Bill Lee announced that he had appointed Alvarado commissioner of the Tennessee Department of Health. Alvarado would resign from the Kentucky Senate on January 6, 2023, and become the 15th Commissioner of the Tennessee Department of Health on January 16, 2023. A special election will be held on May 16, 2023, to fill the 28th Senate District vacancy created by Alvarado's resignation.

References

External links
Profile at the Kentucky Senate website

1970 births
21st-century American politicians
American people of Argentine descent
American people of Costa Rican descent
American politicians of Costa Rican descent
Hispanic and Latino American state legislators
Republican Party Kentucky state senators
Living people
Loma Linda University alumni
People from Pacifica, California
Politicians from San Francisco
People from San Jose, California
People from Winchester, Kentucky
Physicians from Kentucky